Koyonkara is a small village situated in Trikarpur Panchayath of Kasaragod district, Kerala, India. It constitutes the main part of North Trikarpur Village.

Education

The North Trikarpur ALP School is situated at Koyonkara.

Other near by educational institutions are :-
 VPP Mohd Kunhi Patelar Smarka GVHSS Trikaripur
 EK Nayanar memorial Govt. Polytechnic College
 Udinoor Govt. Higher Secondary School
 Government Higher Secondary School south trikaripur, Elambachi
 St Pauls' AUPS
 Maithani GLPS
 Nehru Arts & Science College Kanhangad
 Payyannur College
 North Malabar Institute of Technology
 Academy of Medical Science Pariyaram
 Sanskrit College Payyannur
 Govt. Ayurveda College
 St. Pius College, Ranipuram
 Rajas College, Neelwshwaram
 Govt. College, Cheemeni etc.

Health

The government ayurvedic hospital is situated at Koyonkara.
The Taluk Government Hospital, Trikarpur, situated at Thankayam is one of the major hospital near to Koyonkara.

Community life

Hindu, Muslim and Christianity are the main religions. Koyonkara Poomalakkavu Temple, Koyonkara Pallikal Bhagavathi Temple, Koormba Bhagavathi Temple (Cheermakkavu), Kunhalin Keeshil, vadakumbad juma masjid etc. are the main holy places.

Poomalakavu is famous for "Paatulsavam", Poorakali and Marathukali.

There are many clubs and social organizations working. It includes Malayala Kalavedi, Red Force Arts Sports Club, Vadakumbad arts & sports club (vasc) & Udaya Surya etc.

Transportation
Local roads have access to NH.66 which connects to Mangalore in the north and Calicut in the south. The nearest railway station is Trikarpur on Mangalore-Palakkad line. There are airports at Mangalore and Kannur.

References

Cheruvathur area